Powell Observatory is an astronomical observatory located near Louisburg in Miami County, Kansas. It features several large telescopes and is available for public viewing, for private use of Astronomical Society of Kansas City members, and for ongoing research projects.
 
The observatory, located in Lewis-Young Park just north of Louisburg, was built in 1984 by members of the Astronomical Society of Kansas City (ASKC). Its main telescope is a Ruisinger Newtonian reflector, with a single  objective (mirror), housed in a dome. The observatory also has a  telescope for public programs, a computer-controlled  telescope for research projects and member use, and a small conference/lecture room and visitor's center.

Powell Observatory runs regular public programs every weekend from May through October. The telescope is open for public viewing of the night sky; it is one of the largest telescopes in the United States regularly open to the public for this purpose. The observatory is supported by ASKC membership dues, and by private and public donations. 

During 2009, Powell Observatory hosted Saturday-night "Starbright" programs that began at dusk and included introductory and advanced lectures on astronomy by ASKC members and guest speakers, a tour of the observatory, and telescope viewing if the skies were clear. On many clear evenings and most weekends, ASKC members set up personal telescopes in Powell's courtyard and are available to give tours of the night sky and to answer questions.

Minor planet 25890 Louisburg is named after the home of this observatory.

See also
 List of astronomical observatories

References

External links
ASKC Powell Observatory page

Astronomical observatories in Kansas
Buildings and structures in Miami County, Kansas
Education in Miami County, Kansas
Tourist attractions in Miami County, Kansas